Andrew William Fraser (also known as Drew Fraser, born 1944) is a Canadian-born academic and was an associate professor in the Department of Public Law at Macquarie University in Sydney, New South Wales, Australia.  Fraser holds a BA (Hons) and an LLB from Queen's University, an LLM from Harvard University, and an MA from the University of North Carolina. His most recent book is The WASP Question (2011).

Academic career
Fraser studied advanced constitutional law at Harvard Law School.  He taught American constitutional history at Macquarie University in Sydney until 2005.

Views

Non-white immigration and multiculturalism
In July 2005, Fraser received national attention in Australia with a letter to his local newspaper, signed with his academic title, in which he claimed that importing Sudanese refugees threatened to turn Australia into "a colony of the Third World" and "Experience everywhere in the world shows us that an expanding black population is a sure-fire recipe for increases in crime, violence and other social problems".

Macquarie University responded that it distanced itself from Fraser's remarks, but backed the right of academics to say what they wish in a responsible way. The acting vice-chancellor, John Loxton, stated there was no place for racism at the university, but it "recognises and protects academic freedom as essential to the conduct of teaching, research and scholarship".

Fraser was accused of being affiliated with White Supremacist groups, including the Patriotic Youth League (PYL), by the anti-racist group FightDemBack. Although both he and the PYL initially denied any connection, Fraser admitted he had attended PYL meetings and signed up to the PYL website after video footage of a PYL member describing him as an official legal adviser surfaced.

Following an outcry from Sydney's Sudanese community, Macquarie University Vice-Chancellor Dianne Yerbury on 29 July 2005 decided to suspend Fraser from teaching any further at the campus on the grounds that the race debate was "threatening to spill over into the classroom" and was "affecting the university's ability to operate effectively."
Macquarie University offered to pay out the final year of his contract but Fraser declined, describing the offer as a "dishonorable discharge".

On this incident, Fraser wrote:

Truth is no longer a defence when it comes to charges of academic deviance. Instead of an invitation to debate the issues, the Vice-Chancellor's office sought to get me off campus as soon as possible by offering to buy out my contract. The head of Human Resources made it clear to me that my public comments were damaging their efforts to market Macquarie University to foreign students.
When I refused the offer on the grounds that it amounted to a dishonourable discharge, VC Di Yerbury, ordered that I be suspended from teaching. This was justified on the specious grounds that the safety of students supposedly had been threatened by, among others, my supporters! For what must be the first time in academic history, alleged threats by outsiders to disrupt classes were met, not by tightening security to deal with the disrupters, but by getting rid of the disruptee.

In August 2005, more than 300 Macquarie University staff and students attended a forum on racism and free speech, at which Fraser (as well as Sudanese community and University members) was allowed to put his views from the floor.

Fraser's suspension ended in mid-2006, when an early-retirement package took effect.

In September 2005, Fraser wrote an article advocating a return of the White Australia Policy, entitled "Rethinking the White Australia Policy". The article was set to be published in the law journal of Deakin University, but the university directed the journal not to publish it. "Rethinking the White Australia Policy" has since been published and circulated across the internet.

A complaint from the Sydney Sudanese community about the original newspaper letter was upheld on 31 March 2006 by the Human Rights and Equal Opportunity Commission, on whose direction Fraser reluctantly apologised for his remarks.

Fraser addressed the American Renaissance Conference in February 2006, alongside speakers such as Nick Griffin of the British National Party and Professor J. Philippe Rushton. This was followed up later in the year with appearances at the Inverell political forum in March and at the Sydney Forum in August alongside speakers who included Jim Saleam of the Australia First Party.

Freedom of speech in Australia

In an article for Alternative Right entitled "The Cult of "The Other"", Fraser warned that academic freedom was being stifled in Australian universities. He wrote:

Academic freedom in Australia is dying before our eyes; another sacrifice performed in the now holy name of "The Other."  In the universities, as elsewhere, public criticism of privileged minorities must walk a shaky legal tightrope... Unfortunately, in a mass-mediated wasteland of intellectual cowardice and political conformity, Australian universities are not an oasis of dissent. If my experience as a teacher, scholar, and, more recently, a first-year theology student is a reliable guide, academia is utterly hostile to free thought and frank discussion on race, ethnicity, and gender.

Writings

Fraser has written numerous articles on ethno-nationalist topics for publications such as VDARE, Alternative Right, and The Occidental Observer.

In 2011 Fraser published The WASP Question, in which he examined the failure of Anglo-Saxon peoples in North America, Australia and elsewhere to defend their ethnic identity and interests in the postmodern, multicultural age.

In The WASP Question, Fraser writes:

The defining characteristic of WASPs White Anglo-Saxon Protestants] is that they are much less ethnocentric than other peoples; indeed for all practical purposes Anglo-Saxon Protestants appear to be all but completely bereft of in-group solidarity. They are therefore open to exploitation by free-riders from other, more ethnocentric, groups. It seems unlikely that nominally Americanized Changs, Singhs, and Gonzales are as committed in a practical sense to the anti-discrimination principle as Anglo-Saxon individualists. There is no shortage of evidence to suggest that the Changs, the Gonzales and the Singhs (not to mention the Goldmans with their well-known animus toward WASPs) still practice forms of ethnic nepotism strictly forbidden to Anglo-Protestants.

In these circumstances, an interesting question arises: are contemporary WASPs entitled to recognition as an historic people? If not, why not?

Selected works

Books
 The Spirit of the Laws: Republicanism and the Unfinished Project of Modernity (1990)
 Reinventing Aristocracy: The Constitutional Reformation of Corporate Governance (1998)
 The WASP Question: An Essay on the Biocultural Evolution, Present Predicament, and Future Prospects of the Invisible Race (2011)
 Dissident Dispatches: An Alt-Right Guide to Christian Theology (2017)

Articles
 "Reinventing a Ruling Class". Telos 128 (Summer 2004). New York: Telos Press
 "Monarchs and Miracles: Australia's Need for a Patriot King". The Occidental Quarterly 5(1) (Spring 2005). Atlanta, GA:  Charles Martel Society

References

External links
FightDemBack's archive of material pertaining to Fraser

1944 births
Academic staff of Macquarie University
Queen's University at Kingston alumni
Harvard Law School alumni
University of South Carolina alumni
Living people
Canadian emigrants to Australia